My Bubba is a Swedish/Icelandic duo whose music is described as minimalistic, vocal-oriented folk which 'belies a modern sensibility and often a sultry suggestiveness'. The lyrics are playful and the vocals are simultaneously delicate and  disarming.

Career
Founding and current members are My Larsdotter from Sweden and Guðbjörg (Bubba) Tómasdóttir from Iceland. Bubba plays guitar and My plays a Norwegian Cittra (Lap Harp). They both sing.

My Bubba started out as My bubba & Mi (and was then a trio). Their debut album How it's done in Italy was released in 2010.

Goes Abroader, released in 2014, was recorded in LA's Seahorse Sound Studios and House of Blues Studios. The duo worked with Noah Georgeson, who previously produced albums for Joanna Newsom and Devendra Banhart.

2016's Big Bad Good was recorded as the songs were written at Figure 8 Recording, the studio of producer Shahzad Ismaily, in a collaborative attempt to 'capture the unrefined intimacy of a newly written song'. The album was released on the duo's own label Cash Only.

Early years
My and Bubba met by chance in Copenhagen. Bubba answered an ad to rent a room in My's apartment, and they started singing together the day she moved in. Shortly thereafter they were invited to Italy to tour, and ended up recording their first album How it's done in Italy.

Touring
The group has toured Europe and the US with Damien Rice and Matthew E. White, among others. In 2014 they performed at Roskilde Festival. They have also played festivals like Iceland Airwaves, Copenhagen Jazz Festival, CMJ, Pickathon, Americana Fest  and the Woodford Folk Festival in 2017/18.

Discography
 2017: Gone/You're gonna make me lonesome when you go (Third Man Blue Series Single)
2016: Big Bad Good
2014: Goes Abroader
2011: Wild & You (EP)
2011: Bob (Single) 
2010: How it’s Done in Italy

Former members
Mia Olsen

References

Folk music duos
Swedish musical duos
Swedish folk music groups
Female musical duos